Maddie Parker is a fictional character from the British Channel 4 soap opera Hollyoaks, portrayed by Yasmin Bannerman . She first appeared on 23 October 1995. She remained in the role until 1997 when she quit the role. Maddie left Hollyoaks on 26 September 1997.

Characterisation
Maddie is described as "young, free and single, and always on the lookout for a man". The Liverpool Echo described her as "the streetwise and sassy siren who ran Parker's restaurant."

Storylines
Maddie's earlier storylines started when she received a creepy Valentine's card, which leads to Maddie being worried that someone might be following her. Soon, Michael, an old flame of Maddie's turns up and gets an unwelcome reception. Maddie began to rekindle her love for Michael, as the pair begins to date and reminisce about better times. However, Maddie gets a bit concerned over his jealous behaviour and dumped him. Maddie later discovered that Michael was mentally ill, after he became highly obsessed with Maddie becoming his wife.

Things begin to get increasingly out of hand, when Michael kidnapped Maddie and her friend Jude Cunningham (Davinia Taylor), and took them hostage. He then drove them to Scotland, ready to marry Maddie. Maddie refused to put on the wedding dress and go through the charade of marriage to Michael, which made Michael mad and he took Jude up to the roof as revenge. For a moment it looked as if Michael was going to push Jude off the roof, but Maddie came up dressed in a wedding dress, and he was distracted. As Jude manages to escape his clutches, Michael fell to his death. Jude than tried to console Maddie over Michael's death but Maddie decided to go away to come to terms with it all. When Maddie returns, she told Jude that she wanted a fresh start by expanding the Parkers. Yet, Maddie still found it hard to get over Michael's death and became increasingly insecure about her safety. Maddie decided the only way she could make a new start was by leaving Hollyoaks, and leaving Parkers in the hands of Jude. She left the village to live with her mother.

References

External links
 Character profile on the Official Hollyoaks website
 Character profile on the E4 website

Hollyoaks characters
Television characters introduced in 1995
Female characters in television
Fictional female businesspeople
Fictional Black British people